WINtA is a music video game for the iOS platform, developed pro bono by Masaya Matsuura’s NanaOn-Sha Studio and Triangle Studios, published by ngmoco under the OneBigGame charity initiative. Profits go to Save the Children and the Starlight Foundation

Matsuura-san explained in an interview that through WINtA and the OneBigGame initiative, he wishes to "contribute to the games developer society and communities".

Gameplay 
The game consists of buttons, usually square shaped, that players must tap in rhythm with the vocals of the songs. The squares fill up with a color, and players must tap them when they’re full. The player’s timing will influence the voice sample’s timing as well, and if a square is completely missed, no voice sample will be heard. All levels share this same tapping mechanic and vocal focus, though they may look radically different from each other, as the buttons can have any color or any shape.

Soundtrack 
The title track, Masaya Matsuura's "War is Not The Answer", is included in the initial free application download, whilst additional tracks from various artists are available via in-app purchasing. Some additional tracks are also available for free download.

References 

2010 video games
IOS games
IOS-only games
Music video games
NanaOn-Sha games
Single-player video games
Video games developed in Japan
Triangle Studios games